Joel Daniel Coen (born November 29, 1954) and Ethan Jesse Coen (born September 21, 1957), collectively known as the Coen brothers, are American filmmakers. Their films span many genres and styles, which they frequently subvert or parody. Their most acclaimed works include Raising Arizona (1987), Miller's Crossing (1990),  Barton Fink (1991), Fargo (1996), The Big Lebowski (1998), O Brother, Where Art Thou? (2000), No Country for Old Men (2007), True Grit (2010), Inside Llewyn Davis (2013), and The Ballad of Buster Scruggs (2018). Many of their films are distinctly American, often examining the culture of the American South and American West in both modern and historical contexts.

The brothers write, direct and produce their films jointly, although until The Ladykillers (2004) Joel received sole credit for directing and Ethan for producing. They often alternate top billing for their screenplays while sharing editing credits under an alias, Roderick and Reginald Jaynes. They have been nominated for 13 Academy Awards together, and individually for one award each, winning Best Original Screenplay for Fargo and Best Picture, Best Director, and Best Adapted Screenplay for No Country for Old Men. The duo also won the Palme d'Or for Barton Fink.

The Coens have written a number of films they did not direct, including Angelina Jolie's biographical war drama Unbroken (2014), Steven Spielberg's historical cold war film Bridge of Spies (2015), and lesser-known, commercially unsuccessful comedies such as Crimewave (1985), The Naked Man (1998), and Gambit (2012). Ethan is also a writer of short stories, theater, and poetry.

They are known for their distinctive stylistic trademarks including genre hybridity. No Country for Old Men, A Serious Man and Inside Llewyn Davis have been ranked in the BBC's 2016 poll of the greatest motion pictures since 2000. In 1998, the American Film Institute (AFI) ranked Fargo among the 100 greatest American movies ever made.

Background

Early life 

Joel Daniel Coen (born November 29, 1954) and Ethan Jesse Coen (born September 21, 1957) were born and raised in St. Louis Park, Minnesota, a suburb of Minneapolis. Their mother, Rena (née Neumann; 1925–2001), was an art historian at St. Cloud State University, and their father, Edward Coen (1919–2012), was a Professor of Economics at the University of Minnesota. The brothers have an older sister, Deborah, who is a psychiatrist in Israel.

Both sides of the Coen family were Eastern European Ashkenazi Jews. Their paternal grandfather, Victor Coen, was a barrister in the Inns of Court in London before retiring to Hove with their grandmother. Edward Coen was an American citizen born in the United States, but grew up in Croydon, London and studied at the London School of Economics. Afterwards he moved to the United States, where he met the Coens' mother, and served in the United States Army during World War II.

The Coens developed an early interest in cinema through television. They grew up watching Italian films (ranging from the works of Federico Fellini to the Sons of Hercules films) aired on a Minneapolis station, the Tarzan films, and comedies (Jerry Lewis, Bob Hope and Doris Day).

In the mid-1960s, Joel saved money from mowing lawns to buy a Vivitar Super 8 camera. Together, the brothers remade movies they saw on television, with their neighborhood friend Mark Zimering ("Zeimers") as the star. Cornel Wilde's 1965 film The Naked Prey became their Zeimers in Zambezi, which featured Ethan as a native with a spear. The 1943 film Lassie Come Home was reinterpreted as their Ed... A Dog, with Ethan playing the mother role in his sister's tutu. They also made original films like Henry Kissinger, Man on the Go, Lumberjacks of the North and The Banana Film.

Education 
Joel and Ethan graduated from St. Louis Park High School in 1973 and 1976, respectively, and from Bard College at Simon's Rock in Great Barrington, Massachusetts.

After Simon's Rock, Joel spent four years in the undergraduate film program at New York University, where he made a 30-minute thesis film called Soundings. In 1979 he briefly enrolled in the graduate film program at the University of Texas at Austin, following a woman he had married who was in the graduate linguistics program. The marriage soon ended in divorce and Joel left UT Austin after nine months.

Ethan went on to Princeton University and earned an undergraduate degree in philosophy in 1979. His senior thesis was a 41-page essay, "Two Views of Wittgenstein's Later Philosophy," which was supervised by Raymond Geuss.

Personal lives 
Joel has been married to actress Frances McDormand since 1984. In 1995, they adopted a son, Pedro McDormand Coen, from Paraguay when he was six months old. McDormand has acted in several Coen Brothers films: Blood Simple, Raising Arizona, Miller's Crossing, Barton Fink, Fargo, The Man Who Wasn't There, Burn After Reading, and Hail, Caesar! For her performance in Fargo, she won the Academy Award for Best Actress.

Ethan married film editor Tricia Cooke in 1990. They have two children: daughter Dusty and son Buster Jacob.

Ethan Coen and family live in New York, while Joel Coen and Frances McDormand live in Marin County, California.

Career

1980s 
After graduating from New York University, Joel worked as a production assistant on a variety of industrial films and music videos. He developed a talent for film editing and met Sam Raimi while assisting Edna Ruth Paul in editing Raimi's first feature film, The Evil Dead (1981).

In 1984 the brothers wrote and directed Blood Simple, their first commercial film together. Set in Texas, the film tells the tale of a shifty, sleazy bar owner who hires a private detective to kill his wife and her lover. The film contains elements that point to their future direction: distinctive homages to genre movies (in this case noir and horror), plot twists layered over a simple story, dark humor, and mise-en-scène. The film starred Frances McDormand, who went on to feature in many of the Coen brothers' films (and marry Joel). Upon release the film received much praise and won awards for Joel's direction at both the Sundance and Independent Spirit awards.

Their next project was Crimewave (1985), directed by Sam Raimi and written by the Coens and Raimi. Joel and Raimi also made cameo appearances in Spies Like Us (1985).

The brothers' next film was Raising Arizona (1987), the story of an unlikely married couple: ex-convict H.I. (Nicolas Cage) and police officer Ed (Holly Hunter), who long for a baby but are unable to conceive. When a local furniture tycoon (Trey Wilson) appears on television with his newly born quintuplets and jokes that they "are more than we can handle", H.I. steals one of the quintuplets to bring up as their own. The film featured Frances McDormand, John Goodman, William Forsythe, Sam McMurray, and Randall "Tex" Cobb.

1990s 
Miller's Crossing, released in 1990, starred Albert Finney, Gabriel Byrne, and John Turturro. The film is about feuding gangsters in the Prohibition era, inspired by Dashiell Hammett's novels Red Harvest (1929) and The Glass Key (serialized in 1930).

The following year, they released Barton Fink (1991); set in 1941, in which a New York playwright, the eponymous Barton Fink (played by John Turturro), moves to Los Angeles to write a B-movie. He settles down in his hotel room to commence writing but suffers writer's block until his room is invaded by the man next door (John Goodman). Barton Fink was a critical success, earning Oscar nominations and winning three major awards at the 1991 Cannes Film Festival, including the Palme d'Or. It was their first film with cinematographer Roger Deakins, a key collaborator for the next 25 years.

The Hudsucker Proxy (co-written with Raimi) was released in 1994. In it, the board of a large corporation in 1958 New York City appoints a naive schmo as president (Tim Robbins) for underhanded reasons. The film bombed at the box office ($30 million budget, $3 million gross in the USA), even though it featured Paul Newman and Jennifer Jason Leigh. Frances McDormand appears in a brief uncredited role.

The Coens wrote and directed the crime thriller Fargo (1996), set in their home state of Minnesota. Jerry Lundegaard (William H. Macy), who has serious financial problems, has his wife kidnapped so that his wealthy father-in-law will pay the ransom. His plan goes wrong when the kidnappers deviate from the plan and local cop Marge Gunderson (McDormand) starts to investigate. Produced on a small budget of $7 million, Fargo was a critical and commercial success, with particular praise for its dialogue and McDormand's performance. The film received several awards, including a BAFTA award and Cannes award for direction, and two Oscars: a Best Original Screenplay and a Best Actress Oscar for McDormand.

In the Coens' next film, the black comedy The Big Lebowski (1998), "The Dude" (Jeff Bridges), a Los Angeles slacker, is used as an unwitting pawn in a kidnapping plot with his bowling buddies (Steve Buscemi and John Goodman). Despite initially receiving mixed reviews and underperforming at the box office, it is now well received by critics, and is regarded as a classic cult film. An annual festival, Lebowski Fest, began in 2002, and many adhere to the philosophy of "Dudeism". Entertainment Weekly ranked it 8th on their Funniest Movies of the Past 25 Years list in 2008.

Gates of Eden, a collection of short stories written by Ethan Coen, was published in 1998. The same year, Ethan co-wrote the comedy The Naked Man, directed by their storyboard artist J. Todd Anderson.

2000s 

The Coen brothers' next film, O Brother, Where Art Thou? (2000), was another critical and commercial success. The title was borrowed from the Preston Sturges film Sullivan's Travels (1941), whose lead character, movie director John Sullivan, had planned to make a film with that title. Based loosely on Homer's Odyssey (complete with a Cyclops, sirens, et al.), the story is set in Mississippi in the 1930s and follows a trio of escaped convicts who, after absconding from a chain gang, journey home to recover bank-heist loot the leader has buried—but they have no clear perception of where they are going. The film highlighted the comic abilities of George Clooney as the oddball lead character Ulysses Everett McGill, and of Tim Blake Nelson and John Turturro, his sidekicks. The film's bluegrass and old-time soundtrack, offbeat humor and digitally desaturated cinematography made it a critical and commercial hit. It was the first feature film to use all-digital color grading. The film's soundtrack CD was also successful, spawning a concert and concert/documentary DVD, Down from the Mountain.

The Coens next produced another noirish thriller, The Man Who Wasn't There (2001). 

The Coens directed the 2003 film Intolerable Cruelty, starring George Clooney and Catherine Zeta-Jones, a throwback to the romantic comedies of the 1940s. It focuses on hotshot divorce lawyer Miles Massey and a beautiful divorcée whom Massey managed to prevent from receiving any money in her divorce. She vows to get even with him while, at the same time, he becomes smitten with her. Intolerable Cruelty received generally positive reviews, although it is considered one of the duo's weaker films. Also that year, they executive produced and did an uncredited rewrite of the Christmas black comedy Bad Santa, which garnered positive reviews.

In 2004, the Coens made The Ladykillers, a remake of the British classic by Ealing Studios. A professor, played by Tom Hanks, assembles a team to rob a casino. They rent a room in an elderly woman's home to plan the heist. When the woman discovers the plot, the gang decides to murder her to ensure her silence. The Coens received some of the most lukewarm reviews of their careers in response to this film.

They directed two short films for two separate anthology films—Paris, je t'aime (Tuileries, 2006) starring Steve Buscemi, and To Each His Own Cinema (World Cinema, 2007) starring Josh Brolin. Both films received highly positive reviews.

No Country for Old Men, released in November 2007, closely follows the 2005 novel of the same name by Cormac McCarthy. Vietnam veteran Llewelyn Moss (Josh Brolin), living near the Texas/Mexico border, stumbles upon, and decides to take, two million dollars in drug money. He must then go on the run to avoid those trying to recover the money, including sociopathic killer Anton Chigurh (Javier Bardem), who confounds both Llewelyn and local sheriff Ed Tom Bell (Tommy Lee Jones). The plotline is a return to noir themes, but in some respects it was a departure for the Coens; with the exception of Stephen Root, none of the stable of regular actors appears in the film. No Country received nearly universal critical praise, garnering a 94% "Fresh" rating at Rotten Tomatoes. It won four Academy Awards, including Best Picture, Best Director and Best Adapted Screenplay, all of which were received by the Coens, as well as Best Supporting Actor received by Bardem. The Coens, as "Roderick Jaynes", were also nominated for Best Editing, but lost. It was the first time since 1961 (when Jerome Robbins and Robert Wise won for West Side Story) that two directors received the Academy Award for Best Director at the same time.

In January 2008, Ethan Coen's play Almost an Evening premiered off-broadway at the Atlantic Theater Company Stage 2, opening to mostly enthusiastic reviews. The initial run closed on February 10, 2008, but the same production was moved to a new theatre for a commercial off-Broadway run at the Bleecker Street Theater in New York City. Produced by The Atlantic Theater Company, it ran there from March 2008 through June 1, 2008. and Art Meets Commerce. In May 2009, the Atlantic Theater Company produced Coen's Offices, as part of their mainstage season at the Linda Gross Theater.

Burn After Reading, a comedy starring Brad Pitt and George Clooney, was released September 12, 2008, and portrays a collision course between two gym instructors, spies and Internet dating. Released to positive reviews, it debuted at No. 1 in North America.

In 2009, the Coens directed a television commercial titled "Air Freshener" for the Reality Coalition.

They next directed A Serious Man, released October 2, 2009, a "gentle but dark" period comedy (set in 1967) with a low budget. The film is based loosely on the Coens' childhoods in an academic family in the largely Jewish suburb of Saint Louis Park, Minnesota; it also drew comparisons to the Book of Job. Filming took place late in the summer of 2008, in the neighborhoods of Roseville and Bloomington, Minnesota, at Normandale Community College, and at St. Olaf College. The film was nominated for the Oscars for Best Picture and Best Original Screenplay.

2010s 
True Grit (2010) is based on the 1968 novel of the same name by Charles Portis. Filming was done in Texas and New Mexico. Hailee Steinfeld stars as Mattie Ross along with Jeff Bridges as Marshal Rooster Cogburn. Matt Damon and Josh Brolin also appear in the movie. True Grit was nominated for ten Academy Awards including Best Picture.

Ethan Coen wrote the one-act comedy Talking Cure, which was produced on Broadway in 2011 as part of Relatively Speaking, an anthology of three one-act plays by Coen, Elaine May, and Woody Allen.

In 2011, the Coen brothers won the $1 million Dan David Prize for their contribution to cinema and society.

Inside Llewyn Davis (2013) is a treatise on the 1960s folk music scene in New York City's Greenwich Village, and very loosely based on the life of Dave Van Ronk. The film stars Oscar Isaac, Justin Timberlake, and Carey Mulligan. It won the Grand Prix at the 2013 Cannes Film Festival, where it was highly praised by critics. They received a Golden Globe nomination for Best Original Song for "Please Mr. Kennedy", which is heard in the film.

Fargo, a television series inspired by their film of the same name, premiered in April 2014 on the FX network. It is created by Noah Hawley and executive produced by the brothers.

The Coens also contributed to the screenplay for Unbroken, along with Richard LaGravenese and William Nicholson. The film is directed by Angelina Jolie and based on Laura Hillenbrand's non-fiction book, Unbroken: A World War II Story of Survival, Resilience, and Redemption (2010) which itself was based on the life of Louis Zamperini. It was released on December 25, 2014, to average reviews.

The Coens co-wrote, with playwright Matt Charman, the screenplay for the dramatic historical thriller Bridge of Spies, about the 1960 U-2 Incident. The film was directed by Steven Spielberg, and released on October 4, 2015, to critical acclaim. They were nominated for the Best Original Screenplay at the 88th Academy Awards.

The Coens directed the film Hail, Caesar!, about a "fixer" in 1950s Hollywood trying to discover what happened to a cast member who vanishes during filming. It stars Coen regulars George Clooney, Josh Brolin, Frances McDormand, Scarlett Johansson and Tilda Swinton, as well as Channing Tatum, Ralph Fiennes, Jonah Hill, and Alden Ehrenreich. The film was released on February 5, 2016.

In 2016, the Coens gave to their longtime friend and collaborator John Turturro the right to use his character of Jesus Quintana from The Big Lebowski in his own spin-off, The Jesus Rolls, which he would also write and direct. The Coens have no involvement in the production. In August 2016, the film began principal photography.

The Coens first wrote the script for Suburbicon in 1986. The film was eventually directed by George Clooney and began filming in October 2016. It was released by Paramount Pictures in the fall of 2017.

The Coens directed The Ballad of Buster Scruggs, a Western anthology starring Tim Blake Nelson, Liam Neeson, and James Franco. It began streaming on Netflix on November 16, 2018, after a brief theatrical run.

2020s

It was announced in March 2019 that Joel Coen would be directing an adaptation of Macbeth starring Denzel Washington. The film, titled The Tragedy of Macbeth, would be Joel's first directorial effort without his brother, who was taking a break from films to focus on theater. The film premiered at the 2021 New York Film Festival. In 2022, it was announced that Ethan Coen would be directing an untitled film for Focus Features and Working Title. It would be Ethan’s first directorial effort without his brother. The 2022 Cannes Film Festival had a special screening of Jerry Lee Lewis: Trouble in Mind, an archival documentary film directed solely by Ethan and edited by his wife Tricia Cooke.

Planned and uncompleted projects 
In a 1998 interview with Alex Simon for Venice magazine, the Coens discussed a project called The Contemplations, which would be an anthology of short films based on stories in a leather bound book from a "dusty old library". This project may have influenced or evolved into The Ballad of Buster Scruggs, which has the same structure.

In 2001, Joel stated that "a Cold War comedy called 62 Skidoo is one I'd like to do someday".

The Coens had hoped to film James Dickey's novel To the White Sea. They were due to start production in 2002, with Jeremy Thomas producing and Brad Pitt in the lead role, but it was canceled when the Coens felt that the budget offered was not enough to successfully produce the film.

In 2008, it was announced that the Coen brothers would write and direct an adaptation of Michael Chabon's novel The Yiddish Policemen's Union (2007). They were to produce the film with Scott Rudin for Columbia Pictures. In the fall of 2012, however, Chabon told Mother Jones that "the Coen brothers wrote a draft of a script and then they seemed to move on", and that the film rights had "lapsed back to me".

In 2009, the Coens stated that they were interested in making a sequel to Barton Fink called Old Fink, which would take place in the 1960s, around the same time period as A Serious Man. The Coens also stated that they had talks with John Turturro in reprising his role as Fink, but they were waiting "until he was actually old enough to play the part".

In 2011, the Coens were working on a television project, called Harve Karbo, about a quirky Los Angeles private eye, for Imagine Television.

In December 2013, the Coens stated in an interview that they were working on a new musical comedy centered around an opera singer, though they said it is "not a musical per se".

In August 2015, it was announced that Warner Bros. had optioned the film rights to Ross Macdonald's novel Black Money for the Coen brothers to potentially write and direct.

In October 2016, The Hollywood Reporter reported that the Coens would work on the screenplay for Fox titled Dark Web, and based on Joshuah Bearman's two-part Wired article about Ross Ulbricht and his illicit Silk Road online marketplace. The project originated in 2013, with novelist Dennis Lehane on board for the screenplay. Chernin Entertainment would produce.

On February 10, 2017, it was announced that the Scarface remake's script was being written by the Coens. Luca Guadagnino announced plans to direct the film.

Production company 
The Coen brothers' own film production company, Mike Zoss Productions located in New York City, has been credited on their films from O Brother, Where Art Thou? onwards. It was named after Mike Zoss Drug, an independent pharmacy in St. Louis Park since 1950 that was the brothers' beloved hangout when they were growing up in the Twin Cities. The name was also used for the pharmacy in No Country for Old Men. The Mike Zoss logo consists of a crayon drawing of a horse, standing in a field of grass with its head turned around as it looks back over its hindquarters.

Directing distinctions 
Up to 2003, Joel received sole credit for directing and Ethan for producing, due to guild rules that disallowed multiple director credits to prevent dilution of the position's significance. The only exception to this rule is if the co-directors are an "established duo". Since 2004 they have been able to share the director credit and the Coen brothers have become only the third duo to be nominated for the Academy Award for Best Director.

With four Academy Award nominations for No Country for Old Men for the duo (Best Picture, Best Director, Best Adapted Screenplay, and Best Film Editing as Roderick Jaynes), the Coen brothers have tied the record for the most nominations by a single nominee (counting an "established duo" as one nominee) for the same film. Orson Welles set the record in 1941 with Citizen Kane being nominated for Best Picture (though at the time, individual producers were not named as nominees), Best Director, Best Actor, and Best Original Screenplay. Warren Beatty received the same nominations, first for Heaven Can Wait in 1978 and again in 1981 with Reds. Alan Menken also then achieved the same feat when he was nominated for Best Score and triple-nominated for Best Song for Beauty and the Beast in 1991. In 2018, Alfonso Cuarón was nominated for Best Picture, Best Director, Best Original Screenplay, and Best Cinematography for Roma. Most recently Chloé Zhao matched this record in 2021 when she was nominated for Best Picture, Best Director, Best Adapted Screenplay, and Best Film Editing for Nomadland (which also starred McDormand in her third Oscar-winning role).

Filmography

Collaborators

Accolades

Directed Academy Award performances

Notes

References

Bibliography 
  (Includes all films up to The Ladykillers and some subsidiary works [Crimewave, Down from the Mountain, Bad Santa].)

External links 

 
 
 Joel and Ethan Coen at Rotten Tomatoes
 Coenesque: The Films of the Coen Brothers
 , no catalog records, and Jaynes at WorldCat (joint pseudonym)
 Ethan Coen at LC Authorities, with 38 records, and Ethan at WorldCat 
 Joel Coen at LC Authorities, with 31 records, and Joel at WorldCat

 

Best Adapted Screenplay Academy Award winners
Best Directing Academy Award winners
Best Director BAFTA Award winners
Best Original Screenplay Academy Award winners
Best Screenplay Golden Globe winners
Coen, Joel
Directors Guild of America Award winners
Coen, Joel
Film directors from Minnesota
Filmmaking duos
Coen, Joel
Jews and Judaism in Minnesota
Jewish American film directors
Jewish American screenwriters
Jewish American film producers
Producers who won the Best Picture Academy Award
Screenwriting duos
Sibling duos
Sibling filmmakers
Skydance Media people
Sundance Film Festival award winners
Tisch School of the Arts alumni
Writers Guild of America Award winners
Pseudonymous artists
Living people
Postmodernist filmmakers